Alic Halford Smith (1883–1958) was a British philosopher and Vice-Chancellor of Oxford University.

Alic Smith was educated at Dulwich College in south London and New College, Oxford. He began his career at the Scottish Office (1906–19). Subsequently, he was a Fellow at New College, where he was tutor in philosophy (1919–44), and then Warden (head) of the College (1944–58). Smith was Vice-Chancellor of the University of Oxford from 1954 to 1957. He was also a Fellow of Winchester College and Honorary Fellow of King's College, Cambridge.

Smith was awarded the Freedom of the City of Oxford on 10 February 1955.

References

External links 
 Books, Amazon.co.uk.
 Books from Alibris.
 NRA 4392, Alic Halford Smith, Warden of New College, Oxford: corresp and papers, Reference PA/S.2, The National Archives, UK.
 Selected essays and addresses, by    Alic Halford Smith. Oxford: Blackwell, 1965.

1883 births
1958 deaths
People educated at Dulwich College
Alumni of New College, Oxford
Fellows of New College, Oxford
20th-century British philosophers
Wardens of New College, Oxford
Vice-Chancellors of the University of Oxford